Senator Baumgardner may refer to:

Molly Baumgardner (fl. 2010s), Kansas State Senate
Randy Baumgardner (born 1956), Colorado State Senate
Michael Baumgartner (born 1975), Washington State Senate